National holidays in Slovakia

Table

See also 
 Remembrance days in Slovakia
 Public holidays in the Czech Republic

References

Sources 
 Zákon č. 241/1993 Z. z. o štátnych sviatkoch, dňoch pracovného pokoja a pamätných dňoch
 National and Bank Holidays in Slovakia 

 
Slovakia
Society of Slovakia
Slovak culture
Events in Slovakia
Holidays